The Scarlet Letter (1911) is a silent drama motion picture short starring King Baggot, Lucille Young, and William Robert Daly.

Directed by Joseph W. Smiley and George Loane Tucker and produced by Carl Laemmle's IMP Studios, the screenplay was adapted by Herbert Brenon based on the historical 1850 novel of the same title by Nathaniel Hawthorne.

This second silent version of The Scarlet Letter was IMP's first "IMP Film De Luxe." While only 1000 feet (300 m) in length, it was at that time considered a feature film. It was a critical success and showcased IMP star King Baggot as a serious actor.

Synopsis
Set in 17th century Massachusetts, it is the classic story of a young woman, Hester Prynne (played by Lucille Young), who is forced by her Puritan community to wear a scarlet "A" (for adultery) because she had a daughter by another man while her husband was away.

Cast
King Baggot as Reverend Dimmesdale
Lucille Young as Hester Prynne
William Robert Daly as Roger
Anita Hendrie as (undetermined role)
Robert Z. Leonard as (undetermined role)
J. Farrell MacDonald as (undetermined role)

External links
The Scarlet Letter at the Internet Movie Database
The Scarlet Letter at the Complete Index to World Film Database

1911 films
Films based on The Scarlet Letter
American silent short films
American black-and-white films
1911 drama films
Films directed by George Loane Tucker
Silent American drama films
1911 short films
1910s American films